"On the Atchison, Topeka and the Santa Fe" is a popular song  written by Harry Warren with lyrics by Johnny Mercer. The song was published in 1944, spanned the hit chart in mid-1945, and won the 1946 Academy Award for Best Original Song, the first win for Mercer.

The song refers to the eponymous fallen flag railroad, and was featured in the 1946 film, The Harvey Girls, where it was sung by Judy Garland, with support from Ben Carter, Marjorie Main, Virginia O'Brien, Ray Bolger, and the MGM Chorus.

At one point in mid-1945 versions by Mercer, Bing Crosby, and the Tommy Dorsey Orchestra were on the hit chart simultaneously.  In late September the Crosby version, first to make the chart, was joined by one by Judy Garland and the Merry Macs.

Mercer said the lyrics came to him when he was sitting on a Union Pacific train, and saw another train labeled "Atchison, Topeka and Santa Fe'" and he was struck by the rhythm of the words.  
Despite mentions in the lyrics of the song, the AT&SF never directly reached Laramie, Wyoming (Milwaukee Road or Great Northern Railroad) or Philadelphia, Pennsylvania (Reading Company, Pennsylvania Railroad or Baltimore & Ohio).

Recorded versions
The Johnny Mercer recording was released by Capitol Records as catalog number 195. The recording, with backing vocals by The Pied Pipers, first reached the Billboard charts on July 5, 1945, and lasted 16 weeks on the chart, peaking at number one.
The Bing Crosby recording (backing vocals by Six Hits and a Miss) was made on February 17, 1944  and released by Decca Records as catalog number 18690. The record first reached the Billboard charts on July 19, 1945, and lasted ten weeks on the chart, peaking at number four.
The Tommy Dorsey and His Orchestra recording, vocal by The Sentimentalists, was released by RCA Victor Records as catalog number 20-1682. The record first reached the Billboard charts on August 2, 1945, and lasted six weeks on the chart, peaking at number six.
The Judy Garland/Merry Macs recording was released by Decca Records as catalog number 23436. The record reached the Billboard charts on September 20, 1945, at number ten, its only week on the chart.
It has been covered by other artists including Petula Clark, Louis Jordan, Harry Connick Jr., Mandy Patinkin, The Four Freshmen, Henry Mancini, John Denver, and Rosemary Clooney with Harry James and His Orchestra.

Other uses
AT&SF used a version of this song for television advertisements in the 1970s.
This song's instrumental can be heard in two Tom and Jerry shorts, "The Cat Concerto" and "Jerry and Jumbo".
This song was included in a salute to Disneyland's Main Street, U.S.A. during the opening ceremony of the 1987 Pan American Games in Indianapolis.

See also
List of number-one singles of 1945 (U.S.)
List of train songs

References

1944 songs
1945 singles
Judy Garland songs
Bing Crosby songs
Tommy Dorsey songs
John Denver songs
Best Original Song Academy Award-winning songs
Number-one singles in the United States
Songs with lyrics by Johnny Mercer
Songs with music by Harry Warren
Songs about trains
Johnny Mercer songs